Mátyás Holló (born 14 May 1977) is a Hungarian cross-country skier. He competed in the men's sprint event at the 2002 Winter Olympics.

References

External links
 

1977 births
Living people
Hungarian male cross-country skiers
Olympic cross-country skiers of Hungary
Cross-country skiers at the 2002 Winter Olympics
People from Jászberény
Sportspeople from Jász-Nagykun-Szolnok County